Kajaanin Hokki is a  Finnish ice hockey team based at Kajaani. The team was founded in 1968.

The club
Hokki was promoted from Suomi-sarja to Mestis in the end of season 2001–02 after beating Diskos of Jyväskylä in qualifications.

Hokki's home venue is located in Vimpelinlaakso and has the capacity of 1,591.

Cooperation
Among key factors to the team's success have been the co-operation contract with Kärpät and the army unit of Kainuu Brigade. Co-operation with Kärpät consists mostly of player exchange between SM-liiga and Mestis, which enhances player development as younger players from Kärpät gain experience playing amongst men in Hokki. The players in Hokki in turn get the opportunity to train and play with Kärpät enhancing their chances of playing hockey in Finland's highest tier. Examples of players switching between these teams include Janne Pesonen, Tommi Paakkolanvaara, Tuomas Tarkki, Antti Ylönen, and Jyri Junnila.

Hokki and Kainuu Brigade have made it possible to young players to do their mandatory military service while training and playing competitive ice hockey.

Current team

<small>Updated December 14, 2013

|}

Team officials 
Updated December 14, 2013

References

Mestis teams
Ice hockey clubs established in 1968
Kajaani
1968 establishments in Finland